Kheyratabad-e Barkatak (also Romanized as Kheyratābād-e Barkatak; also known as Kheyratābād-e Bazkatak) is a village in Deris Rural District, in the Central District of Kazerun County, Fars Province, Iran. At the 2006 census, its population was 1,518, in 330 families.

References 

Populated places in Kazerun County